Burj Ran Singh (Shahmukhi and ), also spelled as Burj Ran Singh Wala, is a village in the Chunian Tehsil of Kasur District in West Punjab (Pakistan). It is named after third Chief of Nakai Misl Sardar Ran Singh Nakai.

Geography

During British rule it used to fall under Lahore District.

Personalities
Syed Ali Hussain Naqvi a landlord and a politician also belongs to the village.

Syed Sakhawat Ali Naqvi a landlord and a well known lawyer also belongs to the village.

Jagga Jatt, a heroic rebel of Punjab, belongs to this village. see Jagat Singh Jagga for more references. He is known as the Robin Hood of Punjab. His daughter still alive and lives in 'Vanwala Anu' village of Sri Muktsar Sahib district of East Punjab. She is 90+ now.

See also

 Toba Tek Singh
 Punjab region
 Lahore

References

Populated places in Kasur District